Clarence Verdin (born June 14, 1963) is a former American football wide receiver and kick returner in the National Football League (NFL) for the Washington Redskins, Indianapolis Colts and Atlanta Falcons. He also was a member of the Houston Gamblers in the United States Football League and the BC Lions in the Canadian Football League. He played college football at the University of Southwestern Louisiana

Early years
Verdin attended South Terrebonne High School. He accepted a football scholarship from the University of Southwestern Louisiana.

Professional career
Verdin was selected by the Houston Gamblers in the 17th round (356th overall) of the 1984 USFL Draft. He was also selected by the Washington Redskins in the third round (83rd overall) of the 1984 NFL Supplemental Draft of USFL and CFL Players.

In 1986, he signed with the Washington Redskins after the USFL folded. During his time with the Indianapolis Colts, he was famous for his end-zone celebration known as "The Verdance".  He was selected for two Pro Bowls as a punt returner.

In 1996, he signed as a free agent with the BC Lions of the Canadian Football League, but was released after five games.

External links
 

1963 births
Living people
American football wide receivers
American football return specialists
Canadian football wide receivers
Louisiana Ragin' Cajuns football players
Washington Redskins players
Indianapolis Colts players
Atlanta Falcons players
American Conference Pro Bowl players
Houston Gamblers players
BC Lions players
Players of American football from New Orleans
Players of Canadian football from New Orleans